Patti Harrison (born October 31, 1990) is an American actress and comedian. She is best known for her roles in comedy series such as Shrill (2019–2021) and I Think You Should Leave with Tim Robinson (2019–present), as well as the comedy film Together Together (2021), with the latter earning her a nomination for the Independent Spirit Award for Best Female Lead.

Early life
Harrison was born in Orient, Ohio, on October 31, 1990, the youngest of seven children of a Vietnamese mother and an American father. Her father, a native of Detroit, was in the U.S. Army and met her mother during the Vietnam War when she was working as a janitor in his barracks. He died of a heart attack when Harrison was six years old. Her first involvement in comedy came from her participation in an improv team during her time at Ohio University, from which she did not graduate.

Career 
Harrison moved to New York City to pursue a comedy career in 2015, but later moved to Los Angeles. She has said that her stand-up comedy style has changed drastically since her early days of performing, having initially felt anxious about making jokes about sex and her sexuality due to internalized transphobia stemming from being a trans woman. In an interview with Vogue, she described her comedic persona: "I'm a nasty, stupid person—that's my voice. I'm an evil, shitty person on stage, in a very conscious way—the evil is punching up."

In 2017, Harrison gained wider prominence for her appearance on The Tonight Show Starring Jimmy Fallon, where she made jokes about then-President Donald Trump's ban on transgender people in the military. Since then, she has appeared in the television shows High Maintenance, I Think You Should Leave with Tim Robinson, Broad City, and Search Party, as well as the film A Simple Favor. In 2019, she began playing Ruthie in the Hulu comedy series Shrill after the show's co-creator and star Aidy Bryant contacted her through Instagram and encouraged her to audition. She later joined the team of writers for the animated comedy series Big Mouth during its fourth season.

Harrison was named one of Variety magazine's "10 Comics to Watch" in 2019. Later that year, she co-hosted Comedy Central's digital series Unsend with Joel Kim Booster. She also co-hosts a podcast called A Woman's Smile with River L. Ramirez. In 2020, she co-starred in Yearly Departed, alongside other comedians such as Rachel Brosnahan and Ziwe Fumudoh. That same year, she began hosting a monthly show called Died & Gone to Heaven! at Largo in Los Angeles.

In February 2021, Harrison was banned from Twitter after a stunt in which she impersonated the account of Nilla Wafers in a parody of corporate pinkwashing, and in particular a tweet from the Oreo brand of cookies. The controversy led to her appearing on Jimmy Kimmel Live! to discuss it. Later that year, she became the first transgender actor to take part in a Disney animated film when she voiced Tail Chief in Raya and the Last Dragon. She also made her debut feature film leading role in Together Together, for which she earned a nomination for the Independent Spirit Award for Best Female Lead.

Influences
Harrison has said one of her early comedic influences was Mad TV which she enjoyed watching during her childhood and admired the female comedians on the show, especially Mo Collins, Nicole Sullivan, and Debra Wilson. She has also said Kristen Wiig and Lisa Kudrow are her idols and her favourite movies as a child were the Scary Movie film series.

Personal life 
Harrison came out as a transgender woman shortly after dropping out of Ohio University; she described her family as supportive. She was diagnosed with ADHD in 2021, telling The New Yorker that she delayed seeking a diagnosis until she had "reached a point where [she] was so frustrated with [her] inability to just stay on track". She is also an artist and frequently posts her work on Instagram. She has canvassed for the Democratic Socialists of America.

Filmography

Film

Television

References

External links
 
 

1990 births
Living people
21st-century American actresses
American film actresses
American LGBT actors
American LGBT people of Asian descent
American people of Vietnamese descent
American podcasters
American sketch comedians
American stand-up comedians
American television writers
American voice actresses
American women comedians
American women podcasters
American television actresses
American women television writers
Comedians from Ohio
LGBT people from Ohio
Members of the Democratic Socialists of America
Ohio University alumni
Transgender comedians
Transgender actresses
American LGBT comedians